Alessandro Confente (born 7 June 1998) is an Italian football player. He plays for Vicenza.

Club career

ChievoVerona
He joined Chievo in 2012 and played for their junior squads, including the Under-19 team. From late on in the 2015–16 season, he also became the second- or third-choice goalkeeper for the senior squad and appeared on the bench in most Serie A games, but did not appear on the field throughout 2015–16, 2016–17 and 2017–18 season, behind the first-choice goalkeepers Albano Bizzarri and then Stefano Sorrentino.

Loan to Reggina
On 9 July 2018, Confente joined Serie C club Reggina on a season-long loan. He made his Serie C debut for Reggina on 18 September 2018 in their season opener against Trapani. Four days later, on 22 September, Confente kept his first clean sheet for Reggina in a 1–0 home win over Bisceglie. He continued to hold the starting goalkeeper spot for Reggina early in the season. On 15 October he kept his second clean sheet in another 1–0 home win against Siracusa and, two months later, on 16 December, his third in a 1–0 away win over Casertana. Confente helped the club to reach the play-offs, however Reggina loss 4–1 against Catania in the second round. He ended his season-long loan to Reggina with 33 appearances, 11 clean sheets and 35 goals conceded.

Loan to Robur Siena 
On 16 July 2019, Confente was loaned to Serie C side Robur Siena on a season-long loan deal. On 4 August he made his debut for the club in a 2–0 home defeat against Mantova in the first round of Coppa Italia. Three weeks later, on 25 August, he made his Serie C debut for Robur Siena, a 2–1 home defeat against Olbia. He became Robur Siena's first-choice early in the season. On 15 September, Confente kept his first clean sheet for the club in a 2–0 away win over Lecco. One month later, on 25 September, he kept his second clean sheet in a 2–0 away win over Monza and two more weeks later his third in a 1–0 away won over AlbinoLeffe. Confente ended his loan to Robur Siena with 29 appearances, 33 goals conceded and 8 clean sheets.

Loan to Catania 
He appeared as a back up to Andrea Seculin in the first games of the 2020–21 season for Chievo. On 5 October 2020, he joined Catania on loan for the season. On 29 November he made his league debut for the club in a 2–1 away win over Avellino. Three days later, on 2 December, he kept his first clean sheet for the club in a 3–0 home win over Bisceglie. On 20 December he kept his second clean sheet for Catania in a 1–0 away win over Potenza, and two months later, on 13 February his third in another 1-0 win over Virtus Francavilla. In March 2021 Confente suffered a meniscus injury of his left knee and he stayed out for the rest of the season. Confente ended his season-long loan with 19 appearances, 20 goals conceded and 5 clean sheet.

Vicenza
On 16 August he joined Vicenza with a 2-years contract.

International career
He was called up to the Italy national under-19 football team on two occasions in 2016 and 2017, both time for friendlies.

Career statistics

Club

References

External links
 

1998 births
Footballers from Veneto
Sportspeople from the Province of Verona
Living people
Italian footballers
Italy youth international footballers
Association football goalkeepers
A.C. ChievoVerona players
Reggina 1914 players
A.C.N. Siena 1904 players
Catania S.S.D. players
L.R. Vicenza players
Serie C players